Charles Daniel Sherwood (November 18, 1833 – July 3, 1895) was a Minnesota politician, the youngest Speaker of the Minnesota House of Representatives in state history, and the fourth Lieutenant Governor of Minnesota (1864–1866). He served in the Minnesota House of Representatives 1859–1861 and 1863 from Fillmore County, Minnesota. He was born in New Milford, Connecticut in 1833. He came to Minnesota in 1855 and was a farmer and work in the newspaper business. He died in Chicago, Illinois in 1895. In 1878, Sherwood  settled in Franklin County, Tennessee and platted the community of Sherwood, Tennessee that was named for him.

References

1833 births
1895 deaths
People from New Milford, Connecticut
People from Fillmore County, Minnesota
People from Franklin County, Tennessee
Lieutenant Governors of Minnesota
Speakers of the Minnesota House of Representatives
Republican Party members of the Minnesota House of Representatives
American city founders
19th-century American politicians